Luca Beccaro (born 10 July 1997) is an Italian canoeist. He competed in the men's K-2 1000 metres event at the 2020 Summer Olympics.

References

External links
 

1997 births
Living people
Italian male canoeists
Olympic canoeists of Italy
Canoeists at the 2020 Summer Olympics
Place of birth missing (living people)
21st-century Italian people